Sumo language can refer to:
Sumo languages of Nicaragua
Bouni language of Papua New Guinea (spoken in Sumo village)